The 46th Virginia Cavalry Battalion was a cavalry battalion raised in Virginia for service in the Confederate States Army during the American Civil War. It fought mostly in western Virginia and the Shenandoah Valley.

Virginia's 46th Cavalry Battalion was organized in February, 1864, with six companies. The unit served in W.L. Jackson's Brigade, saw action in Western Virginia, then was involved in various conflicts in the Shenandoah Valley. In December it merged into the 26th Virginia Cavalry Regiment. Lieutenant Colonel Joseph K. Kesler and Major Henry D. Ruffner were in command.

See also

List of Virginia Civil War units

References

Units and formations of the Confederate States Army from Virginia
1864 establishments in Virginia
Military units and formations established in 1864
1865 disestablishments in Virginia
Military units and formations disestablished in 1865